Para powerlifting was one of the sports contested at the 2022 Commonwealth Games, held in Birmingham, England. This was the sixth staging of para powerlifting at the Commonwealth Games since its inclusion in 2002, and the second staging within England specifically.

The competition took place on 4 August 2022, spread across four weight classes (two per gender).

Schedule
The competition schedule is as follows:

Venue
The para powerlifting competition was held at the National Exhibition Centre in Solihull. Five other sports - badminton, boxing, netball, table tennis, and weightlifting - also took place there.

Qualification

A total of 40 powerlifters (20 per gender) qualified to compete at the Games. Nations earned two quotas per weight class, allocated as follows:
 Athletes in the World Para Powerlifting (WPPO) Commonwealth Rankings as of 25 April 2022.
 Recipients of a CGF/WPPO Bipartite Invitation.

Medal summary

Medal table

Medalists

References

External links
 Official website: 2022 Commonwealth Games – Para Powerlifting

 
2022 Commonwealth Games events
Commonwealth Games
2022
Weightlifting in the United Kingdom